That's Entertainment is a Philippine television variety show broadcast by GMA Network. Originally hosted by German Moreno and Ike Lozada, it premiered on January 6, 1986. The show concluded on May 3, 1996 with a total of 3,200 episodes.

Overview
The show was created by German Moreno who initially wanted teenaged celebrity siblings to star in the show and name it as Brothers and Sisters. After watching the American film That's Entertainment!, Moreno decided to change the title of the show. Premiering on January 6, 1986 on GMA Network, the show featured sixteen teenagers (divided into 4 from Monday to Thursday and gathered all together on Friday). The show later joined the network's Saturday afternoon line up. The show first aired from the GMA building in EDSA and eventually moved to GMA Broadway Centrum in 1987 to accommodate a wider studio audience.

The cast members were separated into five groups; Monday, Tuesday, Wednesday, Thursday and Friday. During the Saturday broadcast, all five groups performed together. The show also featured dance groups such as the Manoeuvres, Streetboys, Abztract Dancers, Kids at Work, and Universal Motion Dancers.

The final episode, "That's The Reunion" was aired as a 2-hour primetime TV special on May 3, 1996, which featured former cast members of the show.

Cast

 German Moreno
 Ike Lozada

Original cast

 Jestoni Alarcon
 Jojo Alejar
 Mon Alvir
 J.C. Bonnin
 Mags Bonnin
 Ramon Christopher
 Sheryl Cruz
 Lotlot de Leon
 Gigi dela Riva
 Michael Gonzales
 Jon Hernandez
 Francis Magalona
 Kristina Paner
 Manilyn Reynes
 Lovely Rivero
 Lea Salonga

Succeeding cast

 Jojo Abellana
 Champaigne Acosta
 Ana Abiera
 Aris Adina
 John Aey
 Lorie Anne Aguas
 Bernard Alan
 John Alba
 Almira Alcantara
 Jon Aldeguer
 Rachel Alejandro
 Fatima Alvir
 Aileen Pearl Angeles
 Michael Angelo
 Mark Anthony
 Ellie Rose Apple
 Ryan Aristorenas
 Janet Arnaiz
 Sharmaine Arnaiz
 Reyna Arroyo
 Jun King Austria
 Rita Avila
 Marco Ballesteros
 Raeyan Basa
 Bimbo Bautista
 Harlene Bautista
 Dranreb Belleza
 Romeo Beña
 Vincent Berba
 Richard Bonnin
 Maricone Borja
 Michael Brian
 Arabell Cadocio
 Genesis Canlapan
 Cary
 Mike Castillo
 Gwen Chandler
 Billy Christian
 Johnson Correa
 Cliff Cortazar
 Billy Joe Crawford
 Mutya Crisostomo
 Aubrey Rose Cruz
 Darwin Cruz
 Donna Cruz
 Glenda Cruz
 Jomar Cruz
 Mark Cruz
 Renzo Cruz
 Sunshine Cruz
 Dennis da Silva
 Jonathan Darca
 Jaypee de Guzman
 Keempee de Leon
 Lotlot de Leon
 Assunta de Rossi
 Edwin delos Santos
 Fredmoore delos Santos
 Kim delos Santos
 Cherry Desuasido
 Hazen Desuasido
 Chuckie Dreyfus
 George Dural
 DJ Durano
 Francis Enriquez
 Paolo Escudero
 Aileen Esguerra
 Ace Espinosa
 Miguel Espinosa
 Karla Estrada
 Neil Eugenio
 Anna Marie Falcon
 Adette Figueroa
 Jimmy Figueroa
 Jackie Forster
 Caselyn Francisco
 Shirley Fuentes
 Cecile Galvez
 Liza Galvez
 Raymond Garchitorena
 Garry Boy Garcia
 Geebee Garcia
 Jean Garcia
 Jigo Garcia
 Kenneth Garcia
 Marco Polo Garcia
 Leo Mar Gayoso
 Janno Gibbs
 Melissa Gibbs
 Tina Godinez
 Harvey Gomez
 Michael Gomez
 Richie Gonzaga
 Glenn Gonzales
 Katrin Gonzales
 Regina Grace
 Isabel Granada
 Tootsie Guevara
 Ruffa Gutierrez
 Philip Henson
 Melanie Hernandez
 Marichelle Hipolito
 Precious Hipolito
 Ivy Isidoro
 Gary Israel
 Sarah Javier
 Aljon Jimenez
 Paul John
 Angelica Jones
 Kenji
 Jessa Kintanar
 Charo Laude
 Lieza Lazaro
 Melanie Lazaro
 Bamba Leelin
 Cielo Legaspi
 Lilet
 Cherryl Lipana
 Michael Locsin
 Susan Lozada
 Michael Luis
 Mylene Mabanag
 April Magalona
 Reuben Manahan
 Smokey Manaloto
 Kennon Marie
 Czarina Marquez
 Nikki Martell
 Mel Martinez
 Jo Angelo Matias
 Jasmine Mendoza
 Jennifer Mendoza
 Jenny Anne Mendoza
 Marga Mendoza
 Glydel Mercado
 Princess Michelle
 Vanessa Moises
 Brylle Mondejar
 Nadia Montenegro
 Maricel Morales
 Vina Morales
 Maidu Morato
 Isko Moreno
 Migui Moreno
 Mike Moreno
 Jovit Moya
 Almira Muhlach
 Nicole
 Jochelle Olalia
 Allan Ortega
 Michelle Ortega
 Robert Ortega
 Lanie Rose Oteyza
 Christine Padilla
 Joey Palomar
 Maffi Papin
 Bunny Paras
 John Parcero
 Pinky Pascual
 PJ Pascual
 William Paul
 Anthony Perez
 Adrian Pizarras
 Piwee Polintan
 Rufa Mae Quinto
 Gem Ramos
 William Ramos
 Denver Razon
 Atong Redillas
 Gladys Reyes
 Hazel Reyes
 Joy Reyes
 Victor Reyes
 Babyshake Rico
 Manolet Ripol
 Louie Rivera
 Nathaniel Rivera
 Ricky Rivero
 Jenny Roa
 Martin Roa
 Ana Roces
 Arvin Rodriguez
 Jason Roman
 Raffy Romillo
 Pinky Rosas
 Donita Rose
 Royce Rosello
 Anthony Roxas
 Rayno Ruiz
 Filio Salazar
 Marco Salvador
 Mariel Salvador
 John Salve
 Lester Samonte
 Shara Sanchez
 Jeffrey Santos
 Judy Ann Santos
 Romnick Sarmenta
 Ina Sarosa
 Tyrone Sason
 Joed Serrano
 Jennifer Sevilla
 Melissa Silvano
 Marlo Silverio
 Saldy Silvestre
 Ryan Soler
 Symon Soler
 Strawberry
 Beth Tamayo
 Mike Tayag
 Edgar Tejada
 Francis Tejada
 Marc Tejada
 Karen Timbol
 Ramil Tolentino
 Allan Trinidad
 Med Trinidad
 Don Umali
 Bon Vargas
 Romano Vasquez
 Henry Vega
 Ian Veneracion
 Marilyn Villamayor
 Cris Villanueva
 Michael Villanueva
 Mikee Villanueva
 Jayvee Villar
 Marita Villarama
 Steven Villareal
 Judy Ann Villavert
 Anthony Wilson
 Ronnel Wolfe
 Levy Yanesa
 Erick Yulo
 Kristine Zablan

Segments
 Rednex Dance Contest
 That's Acting
 That's Star Quiz
 That's Stunting
 That's News
 That's Showbiz
 That's Sports
 That's Punk Rock!
 That's Vidjok
 Workshop on the Air

Critical reception
Henry C. Tejero, writing for the Manila Standard, considered That's Entertainment to be the worst musical variety program of 1987, stating that "[t]he show is a veritable fleamarket with Top 40s music as aural wallpaper and alien video lifestyles grossly distorted to conform with popular imagination as visual hypnosis."

Accolades

References

External links
 

1986 Philippine television series debuts
1996 Philippine television series endings
Filipino-language television shows
GMA Network original programming
Philippine variety television shows